Maaman Magal is a 1995 Indian Tamil language romantic comedy film directed by Guru Dhanapal. It stars Sathyaraj, Meena, Goundamani and Manorama, along with Jayachitra in the lead negative role.

Plot 

The story starts from Manikkam's entry in the film. He wants to drag down Devi Rajalakshmi, and he asks Shanmugam to marry his daughter Priya, so those two start cheating Devi and Priya. After Priya and Shanmugam get married, the truth comes to light. The plot takes a twist when Priya applies for a divorce. The plot completes by Priya leaving her solitude and joining Shanmugam.

Cast 

Sathyaraj as Shanmugam
Meena as Priya
Goundamani
Manivannan as Manikkam, Priya's father
Jayachitra as Devi Rajalakshmi, Priya's mother
Pratap K. Pothen as chithra's husband
Anandaraj as Paramasivam
Manorama as Shanmugam's mother
Ponnambalam as Govindhan
Ponvannan as Muthurasu
Sathyapriya as Muthurasu's mother
Kaviyasri as Chithra
Jyothi Meena
Halwa Vasu
LIC Narasimhan
Chitti as Lawyer
Raviraj as Judge
Kavithasri
Gurdas Maan guest appearance in song "Chupke Chupke"

Production 
Sathyaraj portrayed a female character for several scenes in the film, and his voice was dubbed by voice artist Hema Malini. Punjabi singer Gurdas Maan made his Tamil debut with this film; he sang and appeared in a song.

Soundtrack 
The film score and the soundtrack were composed by Adithyan, with lyrics written by Vaali, Gangai Amaran and Kalidasan.

Release and reception 
Post-release, the comedy sequences of actors Sathyaraj and Goundamani were widely appreciated. Kalki called it "a cocktail which has much needed kick that fans expect [..] however the screenplay is too old" but concluded "the fans who are soaked in fights, songs and dance are going to give overwhelming support".

Legacy
In 2018, the trailer of the film Kalavani Mappillai was compared to the plot of Maaman Magal. In 2020, the film garnered attention for celebrating the 25th anniversary of its release.

References

External links 
 

1990s Tamil-language films
1995 films
1995 romantic comedy films
Cross-dressing in Indian films
Films directed by Guru Dhanapal
Indian romantic comedy films